Jean-Claude Decaux (15 September 1937 – 27 May 2016) was a French entrepreneur who earned his fortune in advertising. He was the founder and honorary chair of the advertising firm JCDecaux, which is now run by his sons, Jean-François Decaux and Jean-Charles Decaux.

Personal life
Jean-Claude Decaux was the son of a shoe salesman in Beauvais, France.

He was married with three children and lived in Paris.

His death was announced on 27 May 2016.

Career
At the age of 18, inspired by an argument with his father over the family shoe store's window display, Jean-Claude started a business creating billboards along French roadways. In 1963, legislation in France placed restrictions on billboard use which forced Decaux out of business. He founded JCDecaux in 1964. He made a deal with the city of Lyon, proposing that he would build bus shelters and keep them clean in exchange for advertising space there. The company quickly expanded to other cities.

In 1980, Decaux personally designed the Sanisette public toilet, a self-cleaning public toilet, as a replacement for the pissoirs of Paris.

In January 2015, according to Forbes, he had a net worth of $6.2 billion.

See also
 French Rich List
 List of billionaires
 Sanisette

References

1937 births
2016 deaths
French advertising executives
French billionaires
People from Beauvais
Businesspeople from Paris